The 1975–76 Danish 1. division season was the 19th season of ice hockey in Denmark. Ten teams participated in the league, and KSF Copenhagen won the championship.

First round

Final round
The top six teams qualified for the final round, and KSF Copenhagen finished first.

External links
Season on eliteprospects.com

Dan
1975 in Danish sport
1976 in Danish sport